Jalil Farjad (was born 1951 in Marand, East Azerbaijan) is an Iranian theater, cinema and TV actor.

Selected filmography 
 Cheshm o Cheragh, 2016
 Rah Dar Ro, 2011
 Cheshm-e Khoda, 2010
 Mahfel-e X, 2010
 Operation 125, 2008 
 Ominous Seed, 2008
 Alphabet of Murder, 2005
 Khane Dar Tariki, 2004
 Die Hard, 1999
 Khorshid Karevan, 1990
 Identity, 1987

Notes

External links
 
 Jalil Farjad in Internet database of Soureh Cinema

Living people
Iranian male film actors
Iranian male stage actors
Iranian male television actors
People from Marand
1951 births